Paul Douglas is the stage name  of Douglas Paul Kruhoeffer (born June 12, 1958), a meteorologist, author, entrepreneur, and software expert in Minneapolis-St.Paul, Minnesota. He has over 30 years of broadcast television and radio experience.

Early life and education

Douglas Kruhoeffer was raised in Pennsylvania. His hometown is Lancaster, Pennsylvania. While in high school, he began using the stage name Paul Douglas. He graduated from Pennsylvania State University with a Bachelor of Science degree in Meteorology in 1980.

Career

Broadcasting and journalism
While a senior in college, he began broadcasting the weekend weather reports for WNEP-TV in Wilkes-Barre/Scranton, Pennsylvania, and then after he graduated, he moved to weekdays. He worked for Satellite News Channel, based in Stamford, Connecticut, from 1982 to 1983. This was followed by a move to Minneapolis, Minnesota, where he worked at KARE-TV 1983 to 1994. He was a weatherman in Chicago at WBBM-TV for three years before returning to Minneapolis where he worked at WCCO-TV from December 1997 until he was laid off in April 2008 as part of nationwide cutbacks by station owner CBS.

Douglas wrote a daily weather column for the Star Tribune from 1997 until his replacement by the WCCO-TV weather team in February 2009. He provided forecasts for three local radio stations. He has been a reporter for the Twin Cities Public Television show Almanac.

In 2009, the St. Cloud Times appointed him as the head of their meteorological team and Conservation Minnesota partnered with him to create MNWeatherCenter, a hub for Minnesota weather.

In 2010, the Star Tribune rehired him as a weather blogger.

Businessman
Douglas leads a number of companies that he founded or co-founded, including WeatherNation (as CEO), Broadcast Weather (as CEO) and Smart Energy (as President). In 2007, he co-founded SingularLogic LLC, a patent holding company, and he founded Broadcast Weather and NoozMe LLC, which hoped to capitalize on SingularLogic's patents.

He founded EarthWatch Communications in 1990, which created weather visualizations for the feature films Jurassic Park and Twister. He made a cameo appearance in a weather center scene in the latter. He co-founded Digital Cyclone in 1998 which created weather applications and supplies content for wireless devices under the My-Cast brand name. Douglas sold Digital Cyclone to Garmin in 2007 for $45 million.

Author, educator and speaker
Douglas regularly writes and speaks about global warming and is critical of those who say that it is not occurring or is not caused by human actions.

Douglas has authored two books, Prairie Skies: The Minnesota Weather Book (1992) and Restless Skies (2004).

He has taught broadcast meteorology courses at Saint Cloud State University.

Personal life
Paul Douglas and his wife have at least two sons, Brett and Walt.

References

External links
Article about Douglas's stormy arrival at the StarTribune at CityPages.com
 Paul Douglas Bio at National Science Teachers Association 
A Republican meteorologist looks at climate change April 2, 2012

American television meteorologists
1958 births
Living people